The second season of Cougar Town, an American television series, began airing on September 22, 2010, and concluded on May 25, 2011. Season two regular cast members include Courteney Cox, Christa Miller, Busy Philipps, Brian Van Holt, Dan Byrd, Ian Gomez, and Josh Hopkins. The sitcom was created by Bill Lawrence and Kevin Biegel.

Casting
As of July 30, 2010, former Friends star Jennifer Aniston was in talks with series producers that resulted in her reuniting on-screen with Courteney Cox. Lisa Kudrow guest starred in the season one episode Rhino Skin. On August 23, 2010, ABC announced that Aniston will make a guest appearance on the Season 2 premiere. She will play Glenn, Jules' (played by Cox) shrink. On August 9, 2010, it was confirmed that Ryan Devlin will be back for multiple episodes as Smith, newbie lawyer and love interest of Laurie. Michael Ausiello, from Entertainment Weekly, also reported, on August 4, 2010, that Travis will make a gay friend in this season, and that the show's producers are casting the role of Travis’ "enormous jock-y college roommate" named Kevin. On August 10, 2010, it was revealed that Jeremy Sisto might be playing Ellie's ex-boyfriend, as Christa Miller teased that idea to her husband, the show's creator. On August 11, 2010, it was reported that Bill Lawrence is game on for a Scrubs reunion, where he said that "either Sarah Chalke, Zach Braff, John C. McGinley, Donald Faison or Judy Reyes will be on the show this year". If that reunion episode happen, than it would mark the second time that Christa Miller and John C. McGinley worked together, as they had previously portrayed husband and wife in that show. On September 3, 2010, it was revealed that Ken Jenkins, who previously worked with the show's creator Bill Lawrence in Scrubs, will be portraying Jules father on the Halloween-themed episode, scheduled to air on October 27, 2010. On September 30, 2010, Michael Ausiello reported that Collette Wolfe is joining the series as a love interest for Travis. On October 29, 2010, it was announced by Morgan Jeffery, from Digital Spy, that Zach Braff would guest star in an upcoming episode this season where he'll appear in animated form when Laurie downloads an "appetizer app" to her cell phone that features the star offering culinary advice. On November 2, 2010, it was reported by Matt Webb Mitovich, from Fancast, that newcomer Jennifer Cortese is playing Grayson's ex-wife Vivian, and her first appearance will be on the Thanksgiving episode, When the Time Comes.

Production
On January 12, 2010 Cougar Town was picked up for a second season by ABC. On May 11, 2010, the show's creator, Bill Lawrence, said that he was considering changing the series' title since the name Cougar Town wasn't well received by the viewers. However, on July 30, 2010, he said that the show would keep its original name.

It was announced by ABC that the show would be put on a major hiatus, returning on April 18, 2011, after a shortened Dancing with the Stars and would return to its original timeslot on April 20, 2011 as the new show Mr. Sunshine would premiere in Cougar Town's timeslot.

Reception
The second season of Cougar Town received generally favorable reviews from critics. The season currently holds an average score of 75 out of 100 on Metacritic, based on 7 reviews, indicating 'generally favorable reviews'. Tim Stack from Entertainment Weekly regarded the season in a positive light, citing that "very few shows can get away with genuine moments of emotion while also incorporating the phrase 'dead-baby tacos.'" Hitfix writer Alan Sepinwall also gave a positive review of the show, saying that "midway through the first season the writers realized their cast was so funny together that the wisest course was to just put everyone together as often as possible. By the end of the season, it was often funnier many weeks than the Modern Family episode leading into it. This is still the show that Cougar Town became at mid-season last year."

Episodes

Ratings

U.S. Nielsen ratings

Australian ratings
Over the 13 episodes that have aired they have averaged 0.295 million viewers or 295,461 viewers

New Zealand Ratings
All Sourced from:

Over the 13 episodes that have aired they have averaged 0.328 million viewers or 323,692 viewers

See also
 List of Cougar Town episodes

References

General references 
 
 
 

2010 American television seasons
2011 American television seasons
Cougar Town seasons